Ilex praetermissa is a species of plant in the family Aquifoliaceae. It is endemic to Klang Gates Quartz Ridge, Malaysia.  It is threatened by habitat loss.

References

 http://ongzi-secretgarden.blogspot.com/2010/09/jewels-of-klang-gates-quartz-ridge.html

praetermissa
Endemic flora of Peninsular Malaysia
Vulnerable plants
Taxonomy articles created by Polbot